Carex amphibola, known as gray sedge, is a species of flowering plant in the family Cyperaceae. It was first formally named in 1855. Carex amphibola is native to the eastern United States and Canada.

Carex amphibola is commonly confused with Carex grisea, which has somewhat greener perigynia with more rounded tips, versus the gray-green coloring and angular tips of C. amphibola perigynia. The perigynia of C. amphibola are somewhat more clustered and spreading at maturity, while those of C. grisea are strongly ascending.

Carex amphibola grows in mesic deciduous forests, often in loamy areas near streams.

References

amphibola
Plants described in 1855
Flora of North America